Luis Julián Martín Carranza Ugarte (born December 21, 1966) is a Peruvian economist, banker and academic. He served as Minister of Economy and Finance of Peru in the second presidency of Alan García, from July 2006 to July 2008 and from January to December 2009. During his first tenure, he championed several structural economic reforms that proved extremely successful. Peru achieved their highest continued average growth rates in recent history (8% average), the FTA with the USA was signed, technology and productivity gains in the country were the highest ever in recorded Peruvian history (40% yearly increments in capital investment), and poverty dropped dramatically (from 52% to 34% of total population). He was re-appointed in January 2009, with the looming global financial crisis. Before being appointed Minister, Carranza was BBVA chief economist for Latin American and emerging markets.

Education
PhD in economics, University of Minnesota
MA in economics, University of Minnesota
Licenciature in Economics, Pontificia Universidad Católica del Perú
BA in economics, Pontificia Universidad Católica del Perú

Other activities
Visiting professor, Master in Economics and Finance program, Faculty of Economic and Business Sciences, University of Navarra
Consultant, Inter-American Development Bank

Past Public Service
Member, Board of Directors, Central Reserve Bank of Peru
Deputy Minister of Finance, Government of Peru

References

External links
FT article about appointment as Minister of Economics
University of Navarra press release about appointment as Minister of Economics
Bloomberg article about appointment as Minister of Economics

People from Lima
1966 births
Peruvian Ministers of Economy and Finance
Peruvian bankers
20th-century Peruvian economists
University of Minnesota College of Liberal Arts alumni
Pontifical Catholic University of Peru alumni
Living people
21st-century Peruvian economists